This is about the 9th-century Japanese statesman.  For the 10th-century Japanese poet also known as Nagayoshi, see Fujiwara no Nagatō.

, also known as Fujiwara no Nagayoshi, was a Japanese statesman, courtier and politician of the early Heian period. He was the grandfather of Emperor Yōzei.

Life 

Nagara was born as the eldest son of the sadaijin Fujiwara no Fuyutsugu, a powerful figure in the court of Emperor Saga. He was also a descendant of the early Japanese emperors and was well trusted by Emperor Ninmyō since his time as crown prince, and attended on him frequently. However, after Ninmyō took the throne, Nagara's advancement was overtaken by his younger brother Fujiwara no Yoshifusa.

In the same year, though, Nagara was overtaken once more as his brother Fujiwara no Yoshimi, more than ten years his junior, was promoted to chūnagon. In 854, when Yoshimi was promoted to dainagon, Nagara was promoted to fill his old position of chūnagon.

Legacy 

After Nagara's death, his daughter Takaiko became a court lady of Emperor Seiwa.

Nagara was overtaken in life by his brother Yoshifusa and Yoshimi, but he had more children, and his descendants thrived. His third son Fujiwara no Mototsune was adopted by Yoshifusa, and his line branched into various powerful clans, including the five regent houses.

Before the Middle Ages, there may have been a tendency to view Mototsune's biological father Nagara rather than his adoptive father Yoshifusa as his parent, making Nagara out as the ancestor of the regent family. This may have impacted the Ōkagami, leading it to depict Nagara as the head of the Hokke instead of Yoshifusa.

Personality 

Nagara had a noble disposition, both tender-hearted and magnanimous. Despite being overtaken by his brothers, he continued to love them deeply. He was treated his subordinates with tolerance, and was loved by people of all ranks. When Emperor Ninmyō died, Fuyutsugu is said to have mourned him like a parent, even abstaining from food as he prayed for the happiness of the Emperor's spirit.

When he served Emperor Montoku in his youth, the Emperor treated him as an equal, but Nagara did not abandon formal dress or display an overly familiar attitude.

Genealogy 

Father: Fujiwara no Fuyutsugu
Mother: , daughter of 
Wife: 
Eldest son: 
Second son: 
Wife: , daughter of 
Third son: , adopted by Fujiwara no Yoshifusa
Fourth son: 
Fifth son: 
Sixth son: 
Daughter: , court lady of Emperor Seiwa, mother of Emperor Yōzei
Unknown wife (possibly )
Daughter: , wife of Fujiwara no Ujimune, adoptive mother of Emperor Uda, 
Daughter: , wife of Taira no Takamune,

Notes

References
 Brinkley, Frank and Dairoku Kikuchi. (1915). A History of the Japanese People from the Earliest Times to the End of the Meiji Era. New York: Encyclopædia Britannica. OCLC 413099
 Nussbaum, Louis-Frédéric and Käthe Roth. (2005).  Japan encyclopedia. Cambridge: Harvard University Press. ;  OCLC 58053128
 

802 births
Place of birth unknown
856 deaths
Place of death unknown
Fujiwara clan
People of Heian-period Japan